Joseph Giry de Saint Cyr, also known as Odet-Joseph de Vaux de Giry (14 February 1699, Lyon – 13 January 1761, Versailles) was a French clergyman. His name remains associated with the "cacouacs", a mocking term for the Encyclopédistes.

1699 births
1761 deaths
French abbots
Clergy from Lyon
Members of the Académie Française